Law enforcement in Montenegro is primarily the responsibility of the Police Directorate (Uprava Policije).

Organization

All units of the Police Directorate report to the Police Director. Police Directorate of Montenegro is a law enforcement agency under the jurisdiction of Ministry of Interior. Ministry maintains direct control over internal affairs, issuance of personal documents for Montenegrin citizens (ID, drivers licence and passport), emergency situations management, human resources, financial and budgetary management of Police Directorate. Thus, regarding law enforcement matters, the role of the Minister of the Interior is supervisory, and he has no operational authority over police officers.

National level

On a national level, Police Directorate organized into 5 departments, which are main operational units of police, each headed by Deputy Police Director, while 3 sections and 4 units serve in a support and administrative tasks:

 General Authority Police Department
 Criminal Investigations Police Department
 Border Police Department
 Special Purpose Police Department
 Financial Intelligence Department

In addition to police departments, there are seven additional organizational units, for support and administrative tasks on a national level:

 International Police Cooperation and Public Relations Section
 Analytics and Police Activities Development Section
 Forensic Center
 Telecommunication and Electronics Section
 Information Security and Data Processing Center
 Human Resources and Legal Affairs Unit
 Financial, General and Auxiliary Affairs Unit

Territorial units

For direct execution of law enforcement tasks on the territory of Montenegro, 8 Regional Police Units (Područne Jedinice Policije) exist:

 Podgorica Regional Police Unit (with Police Outposts in Tuzi, Danilovgrad, Cetinje and Kolašin)
 Nikšić Regional Police Unit (with Police Outposts in Plužine and Šavnik)
 Bar Regional Police Unit (with Police Outpost in Ulcinj)
 Herceg Novi Regional Police Unit (with Police Outposts in Kotor and Tivat)
 Berane Regional Police Unit (with Police Outposts in Rožaje, Plav, Gusinje, Petnjica and Andrijevica)
 Bijelo Polje Regional Police Unit (with Police Outpost in Mojkovac)
 Pljevlja Regional Police Unit (with Police Outpost in Žabljak)
 Budva Regional Police Unit

Police of Montenegro is legally governed by Law on Internal Affairs of Montenegro (Zakon o unutrašnjim poslovima). In criminal matters, Police is also bound to adhere to Criminal procedure law of Montenegro (Zakonik o krivičnom postupku), and its officers are required to conduct criminal investigations per instructions of Montenegrin public prosecutors.

Resources and equipment

The Police Directorate has 4,282 employees in 2020:

 4,077 sworn police officers
 2,935 Police Officers
 131 Police Sergeants
 953 Police Inspectors
 58 Police Advisors
 205 administrative and support personnel
 
Public law and order officer on duty is usually equipped with a side gun (usually a Glock 17, CZ 99 are phased out), a pair of handcuffs, a police baton, and a Motorola TETRA MTP 850 S radio communication device.

The Police Directorate operates a fleet of road vehicles, numbering 470 in 2016. Standard patrol car is a white Opel Astra J saloon, although various other vehicles are also operating, notably Dacia Dusters as Border police patrol cars. Special police units are usually seen in Land Rover Defender off-road vehicles and BOV-M armoured vehicles.

Police Headquarters building is located on 22 Svetog Petra Cetinjskog Boulevard, in central Podgorica. It was erected in 2010 and has  of office space, and also houses Podgorica Regional Police Unit. In Podgorica, aside from the new headquarters building, Police of Montenegro uses the old Ministry of the Interior building (located next to the new one), the "limenka" ("the can") building, logistics complex in Zagorič suburb and Special Units training camp in Zlatica suburb.

The Police Academy is located in Danilovgrad, and provides both basic police education, and professional and specialized training. Forensic Center is also located in Danilovgrad.

Aviation Unit

Montenegro's Civil Police Aviation Unit forms part of the Montenegro Government Aviation Unit, and purchased its first aircraft in 1972, with three more SA341 Gazelles transferred from the military air force in the 1990s. Aviation unit also operates two Augusta-Bell AB412. All helicopters are based at Golubovci Airport, Podgorica.

Police Directors
 Veselin Veljović (October 2005 - December 2011)
 Božidar Vuksanović (December 2011 - February 2013, acting director)
 Slavko Stojanović (February 2013 - March 2018)
 Vesko Damjanović (March 2018 - July 2018, acting director)
 Veselin Veljović (July 2018 – December 2020)
 Vesko Damjanović (December 2020 – February 2021, acting director)
 Zoran Brđanin (February 2021 – present)

Ranks

Officers

Enlisted

See also
 Crime in Montenegro

External links
Ministry of Interior
Police Directorate 
OSCE Report Police Reform in Montenegro 2011-2019: An Assessment and Recommendations for Good Governance in Policing - by Novak Gajić
OSCE Report Police Reform in Montenegro 2006-2011: Assessment and Recommendations - by Sonja Stojanović and Novak Gajić

Notes

 
Law of Montenegro